State Route 124 (SR 124) is a  state highway that serves the west-central areas of Walker County in the U.S. state of Alabama. SR 124 intersects SR 118 at its western terminus east of Carbon Hill and SR 69 at its eastern terminus south of Jasper.

Route description
SR 124 begins at an intersection with SR 118 east of Carbon Hill. From this point, the highway travels in a southeasterly direction through Townley, where it has an intersection with SR 102. On the eastern side of Townley, SR 124 turns towards the east and continues in an easterly direction to its eastern terminus at SR 69.

Major intersections

See also

References

124
Transportation in Walker County, Alabama